Mounlapamok is a district (muang) of Champasak province in southwestern Laos. It is 500 km southeast of the capital, Vientiane, near the border with Thailand and Cambodia. It is on the Bolaven Plateau, and near Khone Phapheng Falls of the Mekong River. Its population was 38,774 in 2015.

Climate
The climate is moderate. The average temperature is 23 degrees Celsius. The warmest month, April, averages 26 degrees Celsius, and the coolest, August, 10 degrees Celsius. The average rainfall is 2,406 millimetres per year. The month with the most precipitation is  September, at 541 mm, and the least is in February, at one mm.

References

External links
 
 
 

Districts of Champasak province